The glossy ibis (Plegadis falcinellus) is a water bird in the order Pelecaniformes and the ibis and spoonbill family Threskiornithidae. The scientific name derives from Ancient Greek plegados and Latin, falcis, both meaning "sickle" and referring to the distinctive shape of the bill.

Distribution

This is the most widespread ibis species, breeding in scattered sites in warm regions of Europe, Asia, Africa, Australia, and the Atlantic and Caribbean regions of the Americas. It is thought to have originated in the Old World and spread naturally from Africa to northern South America in the 19th century, from where it spread to North America. The glossy ibis was first found in the New World in 1817 (New Jersey). Audubon saw the species just once in Florida in 1832. It expanded its range substantially northwards in the 1940s and to the west in the 1980s. This species is migratory; most European birds winter in Africa, and in North America birds from north of the Carolinas winter farther south. Though generally suspected to be a migratory species in India, the glossy ibis is resident in western India. Birds from other populations may disperse widely outside the breeding season. It is increasing in Europe. It disappeared as a regular breeding bird in Spain in the early 20th century, but re-established itself in 1993 and has since rapidly increased with thousands of pairs in several colonies. It has also established rapidly increasing breeding colonies in France, a country with very few breeding records before the 2000s. An increasing number of non-breeding visitors are seen in northwestern Europe, a region where glossy ibis records historically were very rare. For example, there appears to be a growing trend for birds to winter in Britain and Ireland, with at least 22 sightings in 2010. In 2014, a pair attempted to breed in Lincolnshire, the first such attempt in Britain  A few birds now spend most summers in Ireland, but there is no present evidence of breeding. In New Zealand, a few birds arrive there annually, mostly in the month of July; recently a pair bred amongst a colony of Royal Spoonbill.

Behaviour
Glossy ibises undertake dispersal movements after breeding and are highly nomadic. The more northerly populations are fully migratory and travel on a broad front, for example across the Sahara Desert. Glossy ibis ringed in the Black Sea seem to prefer the Sahel and West Africa to winter, those ringed in the Caspian Sea have been found to move to East Africa, the Arabian peninsula and as far east as Pakistan and India. Numbers of glossy ibis in western India varied dramatically seasonally with the highest numbers being seen in the winter and summers, and drastically declining in the monsoon likely indicating local movements to a suitable area to breed. Populations in temperate regions breed during the local spring, while tropical populations nest to coincide with the rainy season. Nesting is often in mixed-species colonies. When not nesting, flocks of over 100 individuals may occur on migration, and during the winter or dry seasons the species is usually found foraging in small flocks. Glossy ibises often roost communally at night in large flocks, with other species, occasionally in trees which can be some distance from wetland feeding areas.

Habitat
Glossy ibises feed in very shallow water and nest in freshwater or brackish wetlands with tall dense stands of emergent vegetation such as reeds, papyrus or rushes) and low trees or bushes. They show a preference for marshes at the margins of lakes and rivers but can also be found at lagoons, flood-plains, wet meadows, swamps, reservoirs, sewage ponds, paddies and irrigated farmland. When using farmlands in western India, glossy ibis exhibited strong scale-dependent use of the landscape seasonally preferring using areas with >200 ha of wetlands during the summer, and using areas that had intermediate amounts of wetlands (50-100 ha) in the other seasons. It is less commonly found in coastal locations such as estuaries, deltas, salt marshes and coastal lagoons. Preferred roosting sites are normally in large trees which may be distant from the feeding areas.

Breeding
The young can leave the nest after about 7 days, but the parents continue to feed them for another 6 or 7 weeks. The young fledge in about 28 days.

Diet
The diet of the glossy ibis is variable according to the season and is very dependent on what is available. Prey includes adult and larval insects such as aquatic beetles, dragonflies, damselflies, grasshoppers, crickets, flies and caddisflies, Annelida including leeches, molluscs (e.g. snails and mussels), crustaceans (e.g. crabs and crayfish) and occasionally fish, amphibians, lizards, small snakes and nestling birds.

Description
This species is a mid-sized ibis. Breeding adults have reddish-brown bodies and shiny bottle-green wings. Non-breeders and juveniles have duller bodies. This species has a brownish bill, dark facial skin bordered above and below in blue-gray (non-breeding) to cobalt blue (breeding), and red-brown legs. Unlike herons, ibises fly with necks outstretched, their flight being graceful and often in V formation. It also has shiny feathers.

Sounds made by this rather quiet ibis include a variety of croaks and grunts, including a hoarse grrrr made when breeding.

Gallery

Conservation
The glossy ibis is one of the species to which the Agreement on the Conservation of African-Eurasian Migratory Waterbirds (AEWA) applies. Glossy ibises can be threatened by wetland habitat degradation and loss through drainage, increased salinity, groundwater extraction and invasion by exotic plants.

The common name black curlew may be a reference to the glossy ibis and this name appears in Anglo-Saxon literature. Yalden and Albarella do not mention this species as occurring in medieval England.

References

Further reading

External links

 
 Glossy Ibis - The Atlas of Southern African Birds
 Glossy Ibis Species Account – Cornell Lab of Ornithology
 
 Glossy Ibis Plegadis falcinellus - eNature.com
 Field guide photo page on Flickr
 
 
 http://bo.adu.org.za/pdf/BO_2016_07-101.pdf

glossy ibis
Native birds of the Southeastern United States
Birds of Africa
Birds of the Caribbean
Birds of the Dominican Republic
Birds of Central Asia
Birds of Oceania
glossy ibis
glossy ibis
Cosmopolitan birds